Marius Timon Gervasoni (6 October 1904 – 15 June 1984) was a French rower. He competed in the men's eight event at the 1928 Summer Olympics.

References

External links
 

1904 births
1984 deaths
French male rowers
Olympic rowers of France
Rowers at the 1928 Summer Olympics
Sportspeople from Savoie